Ivar Kristiansen (born 18 February 1956, in Hadsel) is a Norwegian politician for the Conservative Party.

He was elected to the Norwegian Parliament from Nordland in 1997, and has been re-elected on two occasions.

Kristiansen was a member of the executive committee of Bodø municipality council from 1987 to 1995. From 1995 to 1997 he was deputy mayor of Nordland county council.

References

1956 births
Living people
Conservative Party (Norway) politicians
Members of the Storting
21st-century Norwegian politicians
20th-century Norwegian politicians
Politicians from Bodø
People from Hadsel